Agrotis eremata is a moth of the family Noctuidae. It was first described by Arthur Gardiner Butler in 1880. It is endemic to the Hawaiian islands of Oahu and Maui.

External links

Agrotis
Endemic moths of Hawaii
Moths described in 1880